Matěj Kůs (born 11 July 1989) is a former international motorcycle speedway rider from the Czech Republic. He is a Czech Republic national champion.

Between British spectators he is called Matty, Magicman or KusKus.

Career 
Kůs represented the Czech Republic national speedway team and was named 3 times as Speedway Grand Prix Wild Card in Prague. He became a full Czech international representative rider when he was selected for the Speedway World Cup first time in 2008. Kus is supported by Centrum Sportu Ministerstva Vnitra of the Czech Republic.

He began his British league career in 2007, when he rode for Berwick Bandits. In 2007, Kůs was racing for the Berwick Bandits, when a crash left him unconscious for 45 minutes. When he awoke he was suffering from amnesia and reportedly spoke perfect English, a sudden and unexplained knowledge of the English language, a paranormal phenomenon known as xenoglossy. As Kůs had just begun to study the English language, his team members were shocked to hear him speaking the language perfectly. However the effect did not last long and Kůs had no recollection of the incident after two days.

He returned to Britain for the 2011 season after signing for the Redcar Bears and spent the next  three seasons with the club.

In 2014, Kus rode for Berwick Bandits returning to his parent club Redcar Bears in 2015. Newcastle Diamonds speedway bought him in 2016 and paid the transfer fee to Redcar Bears. In 2017, he started well after winning the first meeting of the season in Lonigo (Italy). Unfortunately, he was injured the following week and badly broke his foot in Poland. Kus missed most of the rest of the 2017 season because of the injury, although he managed to ride in the Speedway World Cup at King's Lynn.

His last season in Britain was riding for Redcar and Newcastle in 2018.

See also 
 Czech Republic national speedway team
 List of Speedway Grand Prix riders

References 

1989 births
Living people
Czech speedway riders
European Pairs Speedway Champions
Berwick Bandits riders
Sportspeople from Plzeň